The men's large hill individual ski jumping competition for the 2014 Winter Olympics in Sochi, Russia, was held on 14–15 February 2014 at RusSki Gorki Jumping Center in the Esto-Sadok village on the northern slope of Aibga Ridge in Krasnaya Polyana.

The gold medal won in this event featured Chelyabinsk meteor fragment to commemorate the first anniversary of this meteor strike.

Results

Qualifying
50 ski jumpers qualify for the finals. The top 10 ski jumpers from the World Cup season pre-qualify for the finals. The top 40 ski jumpers from qualifying fill the final 40 spots in the finals.

Final
The final was started at 21:30.
The final consisted of two jumps, with the top thirty after the first jump qualifying for the second jump. The combined total of the two jumps was used to determine the final ranking.

References

Ski jumping at the 2014 Winter Olympics
Men's events at the 2014 Winter Olympics